Thomas Hatton may refer to:

 Hatton baronets, of whom six were named Thomas Hatton, including
Sir Thomas Hatton, 1st Baronet (c. 1583–1658), English politician
Sir Thomas Hatton, 2nd Baronet (1637–1682), English politician
Tom Hatton (actor), British actor and television presenter
Tom Hatton (motorcyclist) (born 1986), Grand Prix motorcycle racer from Australia

See also
Tom Hatten (1926–2019), radio, film and television personality
Hatton (disambiguation)